Acraea rabbaiae, the clear wing acraea, is a butterfly of the family Nymphalidae. It is found in KwaZulu-Natal, Eswatini, from Mozambique to Kenya and in Tanzania.

Description

A. rabbaiae Ward (53 a). Fore wing diaphanous with a black basal dot in 1 b and with discal dots in (1 a) 1 b to 6, 10 and 11, which beneath are united with one another and with a spot in the apex of the cell, forming a black transverse band; the veins at the distal margin black and in cellules 4 to 7 bordering large but indistinct light yellowish marginal spots. Hindwing very thinly scaled, whitish, with black, light yellow- spotted marginal band 2 to 3 mm. in breadth and entirely without other markings. Delagoa Bay to British East Africa and Rhodesia. - mombasae Smith only differs in having the hindwing and partially also the forewing scaled with very light brown-yellow instead of white and the discal dots of the forewing smaller and often indistinct. German East Africa. 
The wingspan is 45–52 mm for males and 55–65 mm for females.

Subspecies
Acraea rabbaiae rabbaiae (coast of Kenya, coast of Tanzania, northern Mozambique)
Acraea rabbaiae perlucida Henning & Henning, 1996 (Malawi, southern Mozambique, eastern Zimbabwe, Eswatini, South Africa: Mpumalanga, Gauteng, KwaZulu-Natal)

Biology
Adults are on wing year-round, with peaks from September to June and from March to June.

The larvae feed on Tryphostemma zanzibaricum and Schlechterina mitostemmatoides.

Taxonomy
It is a member of the Acraea satis species group - but see also Pierre & Bernaud, 2014

References

External links

Images representing Acraea rabbaiae at Bold
Images representing Acraea rabbaiae perlucida at Bold
Acraea rabbaiae at Pteron

rabbaiae
Butterflies described in 1873
Butterflies of Africa
Taxa named by Christopher Ward (entomologist)